The year 2008 involved many major film events. The Dark Knight was the year's highest-grossing film, while Slumdog Millionaire won the Academy Award for Best Picture (out of eight Academy Awards).

Evaluation of the year
2008 has been widely considered to be a very significant year for cinema.

The entertainment agency website IGN described 2008 as "one of the biggest years ever for movies." It stated, "2008 was the year when the comic book movie genre not only hits its zenith, but also gained critical respectability thanks to The Dark Knight. Animated films also proved a huge draw for filmgoers, with Pixar's WALL-E becoming not only the highest grossing toon but also the most lauded. Things got off on the right foot with the monster movie madness of Cloverfield. Marvel got down to business laying the groundwork for their superhero team-up The Avengers with the blockbuster hit Iron Man and their respectable attempt at rebooting The Incredible Hulk. The games-to-film genre took a hit this year, with only Max Payne proving to be a worthy adaptation of the source material. We also saw the highly anticipated big-screen returns of iconic characters like Batman, James Bond, and Indiana Jones – some were more successful than others."

The film industry and review website IndieWire described 2008 as "a stellar year for movies" that "gave us tons of unforgettable classics" such as The Wrestler, 4 Months, 3 Weeks and 2 Days and Che.

Highest-grossing films

The top 10 films released in 2008 by worldwide gross are as follows:

For 2008, the top ten films consisted of three superhero films, three animated films, three action films and one musical film.

Box office records 

 In the domestic box office, 2008 came very close in passing 2007 as the highest-grossing year, falling short by just $30 million.
 On August 4, The Dark Knight reached a $400 million domestic gross in a record time of 18 days. The previous record was held by Shrek 2, which reached it in 43 days. On August 31, after 45 days in release, The Dark Knight reached $500 million domestically, becoming only the second film in history after Titanic to cross the half-billion-dollar domestic milestone, as well as the first film of the 2000s decade. Worldwide, it grossed $997 million on its initial release, and an IMAX reissue in 2009 saw it become the fourth film to gross $1 billion at the global box office.
 Mamma Mia! became the highest-grossing film in UK history until it was surpassed by Avatar in 2010.
 Slumdog Millionaire set several records. At the worldwide box office, it became the most successful British independent film of all time. At the UK box office, it became the highest-grossing British independent film (surpassing Four Weddings and a Funeral), the highest-grossing British film without US studio investment, and the biggest ever weekly "increase for a UK saturation release" (surpassing Billy Elliot).

Events
{| cellspacing="0" cellpadding="4" border="0" 
|- style="background:#dae3e7; text-align:center;" 
| style="width:12%;"| Month || style="width:10%;"| Day || Event
|- valign="top"
| rowspan="9" style="text-align:center;"| January
| style="text-align:center; vertical-align:top;"| 7 || Due to the 2007–2008 Writers Guild of America Strike, NBC and the Hollywood Foreign Press Association scrap plans to hold its 65th Golden Globe Awards ceremony and instead hold a press conference announcing the winners
|-
| style="text-align:center; vertical-align:top;"| 13 || The 65th Golden Globe Awards winners were announced.
|-
| style="text-align:center; vertical-align:top;"| 16 || The 61st BAFTA Awards nominations were announced with Atonement the leading film with 14 nominations closely followed by No Country for Old Men and There Will Be Blood, both with 7 nominations
|-
| style="text-align:center; vertical-align:top;"| 17 – 27 || The 26th Sundance Film Festival is opened with the world premiere of Martin McDonagh's In Bruges and screens over 120 films. The Grand Jury and Audience Award prizes are awarded to Frozen River and The Wackness, respectively. The festival is closed by the world premiere of Bernard Shakey's CSNY/Déjà Vu
|-
| rowspan="2" style="text-align:center; vertical-align:top;"| 22 || The 80th Academy Awards nominations were announced with No Country for Old Men and There Will Be Blood the leading films with 8 nominations each, closely followed by Atonement and Michael Clayton, both with 7
|-
| The Oscar-nominated actor Heath Ledger, 28, is found dead at his home in Manhattan, New York City, from an accidental prescription pills overdose.
|-
| style="text-align:center; vertical-align:top;"| 23 – 3 || The 37th Rotterdam International Film Festival is opened with the world premiere of Lucía Cedrón's narrative feature-film debut Lamb of God (Cordero de Dios).
|-
| style="text-align:center; vertical-align:top;"| 26 || The 60th Directors Guild of America Award dinner is held in the Hyatt Regency Century Plaza, Los Angeles. The Outstanding Directorial Achievement in Feature Film prize is awarded to Joel and Ethan Coen
|-
| style="text-align:center; vertical-align:top;"| 27 || The 14th Screen Actors Guild Awards ceremony is held in the Shrine Exposition Center, Los Angeles.
|- valign="top"
| rowspan="8" style="text-align:center;"| February
| style="text-align:center; vertical-align:top;"| 7 – 17 || The 58th Berlin International Film Festival is opened with the world premiere of Martin Scorsese's Shine a Light and screens over 350 films. The Golden Bear prize is awarded to Elite Squad. The Silver Bear prizes are awarded to Paul Thomas Anderson, Best Director, Reza Naji, Best Actor and Sally Hawkins, Best Actress. The festival is closed by the international premiere of Michel Gondry's Be Kind Rewind|-
| style="text-align:center; vertical-align:top;"| 8 || The 35th Annie Awards ceremony is held in the UCLA's Royce Hall, Los Angeles. The Best Animated Feature prize is awarded to Ratatouille|-
| style="text-align:center; vertical-align:top;"| 9 || The 60th Writers Guild of America Awards are announced in a brief statement. The Best Adapted Screenplay and Best Original Screenplay prizes are awarded to Joel and Ethan Coen (No Country for Old Men) and Diablo Cody (Juno), respectively
|-
| style="text-align:center; vertical-align:top;"| 10 || The 61st BAFTA Awards ceremony is held in the Royal Opera House, London. Anthony Hopkins is honoured with the Academy Fellowship.
|-
| style="text-align:center; vertical-align:top;"| 12 || The members of the WGA agree a three-year deal with the AMPTP and vote to end the 3-month 2007–2008 Writers Guild of America Strike
|-
| rowspan="2" style="text-align:center; vertical-align:top;"| 23 || The 28th Golden Raspberry Awards ceremony is held in Santa Monica, California.
|-
| The 23rd Independent Spirit Awards ceremony is broadcast. The Best Film award is given to Juno. The Best Actor and Best Actress awards are given to Philip Seymour Hoffman and Elliot Page respectively
|-
| style="text-align:center; vertical-align:top;"| 24 || The 80th Academy Awards ceremony is held in the Kodak Theatre, Hollywood.
|- valign="top"
| rowspan="3" style="text-align:center;"| March
| style="text-align:center;"| 3 || The 28th Genie Awards
|-
| style="text-align:center;"| 9 || The 13th Empire Awards is held in the Grosvenor House Hotel in London, England.
|-
| style="text-align:center;"| 13 – 21 || 7th Tiburon International Film Festival
|- valign="top"
| rowspan="3" style="text-align:center;"| April
| style="text-align:center;"| 4 – 13 || 10th Sarasota Film Festival
|-
| style="text-align:center;"| 23 – 4 || 7th Tribeca Film Festival
 2008 Best Narrative Feature – Let the Right One In
 2008 Best Documentary – Pray the Devil Back to Hell|-
| style="text-align:center;"| 24 – 8 || 51st San Francisco International Film Festival
|- valign="top"
| rowspan="4" style="text-align:center;"| May
|-
| style="text-align:center;"| 14 – 25 || Entre les murs wins the Palme d'Or while Gomorrah receives the Grand Prix at the Cannes Film Festival.
|-
| style="text-align:center;"| 22 – 15 || 34th Seattle International Film Festival
|-
| style="text-align:center;"| 26 || Indiana Jones and the Kingdom of the Crystal Skull earns $126 million in the United States and Canada, becoming the highest-grossing debut of 2008 and the second-highest-grossing for a Memorial Day weekend debut behind Pirates of the Caribbean: At World's End.
|- valign="top"
| rowspan="5" style="text-align:center;"| June
| rowspan="2" style="text-align:center;"| 1 || The 2008 MTV Movie Awards winners were announced
|-
| A massive fire destroys portions of facilities at Universal Studios in Universal City near Los Angeles, California.
|-
| style="text-align:center;"| 14 – 22 || 11th Shanghai International Film Festival
|-
| style="text-align:center;"| 18 || Iron Man becomes the first movie of 2008 to earn $300 million in the United States and Canada.
|-
| style="text-align:center;"| 18 – 29 || 62nd Edinburgh International Film Festival. The festival launches a new sidebar celebrating the spirit of discovery, including selections Bigga than Ben, Blood Car, Crack Willow, Spike, Strange Girls, and The Third Pint.
|- valign="top"
| style="text-align:center;"| July
| style="text-align:center;"| 17 – 26 || 8th Era New Horizons Film Festival
|- valign="top"
| rowspan="4" style="text-align:center;"| August
| style="text-align:center;"| 4 || The Dark Knight reached $400 million in record time at 18 days. The previous record was held by Shrek 2, which reached it in 43 days.
|-
| style="text-align:center;"| 6 – 16 || 61st Locarno International Film Festival
|-
| style="text-align:center;"| 21 – 1 || 32nd Montreal World Film Festival
|-
| style="text-align:center;"| 27 – 6 || 65th Venice International Film Festival
|- valign="top"
| rowspan="4" style="text-align:center;"| September
| style="text-align:center;"| 4 – 13 || 33rd Toronto International Film Festival
|-
| style="text-align:center;"| 15 – 20  || 33rd Polish Film Festival in Gdynia
|-
| style="text-align:center;"| 18 – 27 || 56th San Sebastián International Film Festival
|-
| style="text-align:center;"| 23 – 30  || 6th Bangkok International Film Festival
|- valign="top"
| rowspan="3" style="text-align:center;"| October
| style="text-align:center;"| 1 – 12 || 16th Raindance Film Festival
|-
| style="text-align:center;"| 15 – 30 || 52nd London Film Festival
|-
| style="text-align:center;"| 18 – 26 || 21st Tokyo International Film Festival
|- valign="top"
| style="text-align:center;"| November
| style="text-align:center;"| 18 – 28 || 32nd Cairo International Film Festival
|- valign="top"
| rowspan="2" style="text-align:center;"| December
| style="text-align:center;"| 5 – 14 || 10th Jakarta International Film Festival
|-
| style="text-align:center;"| 4 – 14 || 23rd Mar del Plata International Film Festival
|}

Awards

 2008 films 
The list of films released in 2008, arranged by country, are as follows:
 American films
 Argentine films
 Australian films
 Bengali films
 Bollywood films
 Brazilian films
 British films
 French films
 Hong Kong films
 Italian films
 Japanese films
 Mexican films
 Pakistani films
 Russian films
 South Korean films
 Spanish films
 List of Kannada films of 2008
Malayalam films
 Tamil films
 Telugu films

Births
January 24 - Chlaui Malayao, Filipina child actress
March 14 - Abby Ryder Fortson, American actress
June 3 - Harshaali Malhotra, Indian actress
July 15 - Iain Armitage, American actor
August 1 - Emma Berman, American actress
November 23 - Asher Blinkoff, American actor
December 22 - Madeleine McGraw, American actress
December 27 - Faithe Herman, American actress
December - Chloe Coleman, American actress

Deaths

 Film debuts 
 Chadwick Boseman – The Express: The Ernie Davis Story Jessica Chastain – Jolene Todd Hanson – The Onion Movie Boyd Holbrook – Milk Felicity Jones – Flashbacks of a Fool Nick Kroll – Adventures of Power Jennifer Lawrence – Garden Party Riyadh Mahmood – Aduri 
 Rooney Mara – Dream Boy John Oliver – The Love Guru Margot Robbie – Vigilante Gina Rodriguez – Calling It Quits Davide Sordella, Pablo Benedetti – Woman's Hearts Jeremy Strong – Humboldt County Tessa Thompson – Make It Happen''

See also
 2008

References

 
Film by year